Ceto may refer to:

Places
Indonesia
Ceto Temple, a Hindu temple in Central Java
Italy
Ceto, Lombardy, a comune in the Province of Brescia
Other
65489 Ceto, a trans-Neptunian scattered disc object

Mythology
 Ceto (Greek myth)
Ceto (also called Krataiis), a primordial sea goddess in Greek mythology, daughter of Pontus and Gaia and mother to the Phorcydes
Ceto, one of the Nereids in Greek mythology
Ceto (Oceanid), a Naiad and Oceanid in Greek mythology, daughter of Oceanus and Tethys

Other uses
CETO Wave Power, an underwater wave power technology

See also

Keto (disambiguation)
Seto (disambiguation)
Cetus (mythology) (Ketos), a general term for sea monsters in Greek mythology